Loki is an American television series created by Michael Waldron for the streaming service Disney+, based on Marvel Comics featuring the character of the same name. It is the third television series in the Marvel Cinematic Universe (MCU) produced by Marvel Studios, sharing continuity with the films of the franchise. The series takes place after the events of the film Avengers: Endgame (2019), in which an alternate version of Loki created a new timeline. Waldron served as head writer and Kate Herron directed the first season, with Eric Martin and the duo Justin Benson and Aaron Moorhead serving as head writer and leading the directing team for the second season, respectively.

Tom Hiddleston reprises his role as Loki from the film series. Gugu Mbatha-Raw, Wunmi Mosaku, Eugene Cordero, Tara Strong, Owen Wilson, Sophia Di Martino, Sasha Lane, Jack Veal, DeObia Oparei, Richard E. Grant, and Jonathan Majors also star. By September 2018, Marvel Studios was developing a number of limited series for Disney+, centered on supporting characters from the MCU films. A series featuring Hiddleston as Loki was confirmed in November 2018. Waldron was hired in February 2019, and Herron had joined by that August. Martin, who served as a writer on the first season, was revealed to be writing the entire second season in February 2022, along with Benson and Moorhead joining to direct the majority of the season's episodes. Filming occurred in Atlanta, Georgia for the first season, with the second season being filmed in the United Kingdom.

Loki premiered on June 9, 2021. Its first season, consisting of six episodes, concluded on July 14 and is part of Phase Four of the MCU. It received positive reviews, especially for the performances. A second season, also consisting of six episodes, is expected to be released in mid-2023 as part of Phase Five.

Premise 
After stealing the Tesseract during the events of Avengers: Endgame (2019), an alternate version of Loki is brought to the mysterious Time Variance Authority (TVA), a bureaucratic organization that exists outside of time and space and monitors the timeline. They give Loki a choice: face being erased from existence due to being a "time variant", or help fix the timeline and stop a greater threat. Loki ends up trapped in his own crime thriller, traveling through time.

Cast and characters 

 Tom Hiddleston as Loki:Thor's adopted brother and the god of mischief, based on the Norse mythological deity of the same name. This is an alternate, "time variant" version of Loki who created a new timeline in Avengers: Endgame (2019) beginning in 2012. Because of this, he has not gone through the events of Thor: The Dark World (2013) or Thor: Ragnarok (2017), which reformed the previously villainous character before his death in Avengers: Infinity War (2018). Head writer Michael Waldron compared Loki to Apple Inc. co-founder Steve Jobs since both were adopted and love being in control. Hiddleston expressed interest in returning to the role in order to explore Loki's powers, particularly his shapeshifting, which plays into the series' exploration of identity. Loki's sex in the series is denoted by the Time Variance Authority as "fluid", referencing the character's genderfluidity in Marvel Comics that had previously been speculated on for the MCU given his shapeshifting ability. Waldron said he was aware of how many people identify with Loki's genderfluidity and were "eager for that representation". The series also reveals Loki as bisexual, becoming the first major queer character in the MCU. The series also explores more of Loki's magical abilities, such as his telekinesis and energy blasts.
 Gugu Mbatha-Raw as Ravonna Renslayer:The former TVA Hunter A-23 who rose from the ranks to become a respected judge; she oversees the Loki variant investigation. Director Kate Herron compared both Mbatha-Raw and Renslayer to chameleons, and said Renslayer was always "trying to dance the line" with Mobius of being both his superior and his friend. Herron added that Mbatha-Raw brought a warmth to Renslayer, while also channeling her pain. Loki explores the origins of Renslayer, which predates the character's appearances in the comics, and Mbatha-Raw enjoyed being able to start "something fresh" with the character. Mbatha-Raw called Renslayer "incredibly ambitious" and felt there was the "ultimate personality clash" between her and Loki. She continued that Renslayer has "a lot on her shoulders" and has to make "morally ambiguous choices", which forces the character to keep secrets and build up layers. Waldron believed that Renslayer had "the making of a very complex villain".
 Wunmi Mosaku as Hunter B-15:A high ranking Hunter of the TVA determined to stop the variant that has been killing Minutemen troops. Mosaku called B-15 a "badass" who is a loyal devotee of the TVA, with a strong affinity for the Time-Keepers, whom she believes are gods. Mosaku was drawn to B-15's honesty and ability to be herself, noting, "She doesn't have any social etiquette running through her and her interactions. What she feels and what she thinks is what you see and what you get." Hunter B-15 was originally written as a male character, but changed after Mosaku's audition; she pointed out that the character's gender did not alter the essence of the type of character B-15 was meant to be.
 Eugene Cordero as Casey: A TVA receptionist. Cordero also portrays Hunter K-5E in the new TVA seen at the end of the first season.
 Tara Strong voices Miss Minutes:The animated anthropomorphic clock mascot of the TVA. Strong voices Miss Minutes with a "Southern drawl", which Herron felt was a representation of Waldron, since he is from the Southern United States. After being created solely to introduce the TVA, the writers found more ways to include Miss Minutes in the series since they found her to be a fun character. Her design was inspired by Felix the Cat and other cartoons from the early 20th century, with Herron calling Miss Minutes a "Roger Rabbit kind of character". Strong felt the "dire information" Miss Minutes is tasked with conveying was "the perfect mix of who she is", since it is said "with a smile on her face". Miss Minutes has a "protective" relationship to He Who Remains, with Strong believing she understands "how important her role is and how important it is to the universe".
 Owen Wilson as Mobius M. Mobius:An agent of the TVA who specializes in the investigations of particularly dangerous time criminals. Herron likened Mobius to a hard-boiled detective, with Wilson comparing him to the character Jack Cates in 48 Hrs. (1982). Marvel Studios president Kevin Feige noted that the character is similar to Wilson in that he is unfazed by the MCU; Hiddleston helped Wilson prepare for the role by explaining and showing him moments from the MCU films, which Wilson felt was useful for when Mobius interviews Loki in the series. Wilson and Herron examined Good Will Hunting (1997) as inspiration for Mobius being a mentor and therapist for Loki who still pushes him.
 Sophia Di Martino as Sylvie:A variant of Loki who is attacking the "Sacred Timeline" and has enchantment powers. She does not consider herself to be a Loki, using the name "Sylvie" as an alias. While Sylvie was inspired by Sylvie Lushton / Enchantress and Lady Loki from the comics, she is a different person with a different backstory from those characters as well as Hiddleston's Loki. Di Martino said Hiddleston had "looked after" her and gave her advice on playing the character, while she did her own research and preparation for the role. Di Martino kept her regional accent for Sylvie, in order to not sound "too posh or too well spoken" to help reflect the life Sylvie had lived. Hiddleston felt Di Martino incorporated "certain characteristics" he uses for Loki to portray Sylvie, while still making the character "completely her own". Herron believed that Sylvie dealing with her pain put her in a similar headspace as Loki was in Thor (2011). Di Martino looked to the fight scenes of Atomic Blonde (2017) to create Sylvie's fighting style, calling her a "street fighter" with more of a brawler fighting style, compared to Loki's "balletic" style. An extensive backstory for the character was written by series' writer Elissa Karasik, with Waldron hopeful some of the material could be featured in the second season. Cailey Fleming portrays a young Sylvie.
 Sasha Lane as Hunter C-20: A TVA Hunter kidnapped and enchanted by Sylvie to reveal the location of the Time-Keepers.
 Jack Veal as Kid Loki: A young variant of Loki who created a Nexus event by killing Thor and considers himself the king of the Void.
 DeObia Oparei as Boastful Loki: A Loki variant who makes wild exaggerations about his accomplishments.
 Richard E. Grant as Classic Loki:An old Loki variant who faked his death to escape being killed by Thanos and decided to live his life in seclusion until he became lonely. Classic Loki has the ability to conjure larger, more elaborate illusions than Loki.
 Jonathan Majors as He Who Remains and Victor Timely: Variants of Kang the Conqueror.
 He Who Remains is a scientist from the 31st century who ended the first multiversal war by destroying "evil variants" of himself, and created the TVA to prevent a new multiverse from forming and to keep his variants from coming back into existence. He is an original creation for the series, inspired by a separate comic book character of the same name as well as the character Immortus. Describing He Who Remains as a "very charismatic sociopath", Waldron did not show how evil the character can be since much of his role is trying to convince others that his variants are worse than him. Majors talked with Herron and Marvel Studios about finding the psychology of the character, since He Who Remains has been in isolation and running the TVA for so long. Herron added that they tried to find "that fine line between the extrovert and the introvert of that character and how does he show that he's been living on his own". Majors utilized his classical clown training for the part, and believed that he smiled more as He Who Remains than any of his other roles combined. Additionally, he was inspired by The Wizard of Oz (1939), Sunset Boulevard (1950), Citizen Kane (1941), and Willy Wonka & the Chocolate Factory (1971) for his portrayal, believing He Who Remains was the "archetype of the wizard and what happens to him when he gets bored... [a]nd he becomes a trickster".
 Victor Timely is a man in the early 1900s presenting futuristic tech to a crowd, who will appear in the second season. He wears spectacles and a three-piece suit. The character was first introduced at the end of Ant-Man and the Wasp: Quantumania (2023).

Episodes

Season 1 (2021)

Season 2 

The six-episode season will be written by Eric Martin, with duo Justin Benson and Aaron Moorhead directing the majority of episodes. It will premiere in mid-2023.

Production

Development 
By September 2018, Marvel Studios was developing several limited series for its parent company Disney's streaming service, Disney+, to be centered on supporting characters from the Marvel Cinematic Universe (MCU) films who had not starred in their own films, such as Loki; the actors who portrayed the characters in the films were expected to reprise their roles for the limited series. The series were expected to be six to eight episodes each and have a "hefty [budget] rivaling those of a major studio production". The series would be produced by Marvel Studios, rather than Marvel Television which produced previous television series in the MCU. Marvel Studios President Kevin Feige was believed to be taking a "hands-on role" in each series' development, focusing on "continuity of story" with the films and "handling" the actors who would be reprising their roles from the films. Disney CEO Bob Iger confirmed in November that a series centered on Loki was in development and that Tom Hiddleston was expected to reprise his role from the film series.

The series was expected to follow Loki as he "pops up throughout human history as an unlikely influencer on historical events". Marvel Studios chose to make a series about Loki because of his story potential, and because he had lived for thousands of years in the MCU and a series could fill in the blanks of his various unseen adventures. The series also provided Marvel Studios the opportunity to work with Hiddleston more, explore the character beyond his supporting role in the films, and show him build new relationships rather than just developing his relationship with Thor. This allowed Loki's previous film appearances to retain their integrity, so the series did not have to retread those storylines.

Hiddleston considered Loki's death in Avengers: Infinity War (2018) to be the emotional end of his character arc, though he knew when he filmed the death scene that he would make a cameo appearance in Avengers: Endgame (2019). That Endgame scene sees a 2012 version of Loki escape with the Tesseract, which was not intended by the writers to set up a future television series as Loki was not planned then. Hiddleston was unaware of where Loki had gone with the Tesseract when he filmed the scene in 2017, and did not learn about plans for Loki until around six weeks before Infinity War was released. He kept plans for the series a secret until the official announcement later in 2018, and later expressed excitement about being able to develop Loki differently by taking an earlier version of the character and bringing him into contact with new, more "formidable" opponents.

Michael Waldron was hired as head writer and executive producer of the series in February 2019, and was set to write the first episode. In August 2019, Kate Herron was announced as director and executive producer. In addition to Waldron and Herron, executive producers for the series include Feige, D'Esposito, Alonso, Broussard, and Hiddleston. The first season consists of six, 40–50 minute episodes.

Loki was originally planned as a single season, but during production of the first season it was realized that there was "so much to explore with Loki" and the story could continue; development on a second season had begun by November 2020. In January 2021, Waldron signed an overall deal with Disney and part of that deal included his involvement in the second season of Loki "in some capacity". Marvel Studios producer Nate Moore, who served as an executive producer on the series The Falcon and the Winter Soldier, believed Loki had "really irreverent and clever and cool" storylines that lent to the series having multiple seasons rather than being a one-off event. A second season was confirmed through a mid-credits scene in the first season finale. Herron said she would not return as director for the second season, and in July 2021, Waldron said it "remain[ed] to be seen" if he would be involved. In February 2022, the directing duo Justin Benson and Aaron Moorhead were hired to direct a majority of the episodes for the second season, while Eric Martin, a first-season writer who took over some of Waldron's duties during production on that season, was set to write the six-episode second season. Benson and Moorhead previously directed two episodes of Moon Knight (2022), which went "so smoothly" that Marvel Studios wanted the duo to work on other projects, and they were quickly chosen for the second season of Loki. Hiddleston and Waldron were set to return as executive producers at that time.

Writing 
The series begins after Avengers: Endgame, which saw Loki steal the Tesseract during the 2012 events of The Avengers (2012), creating an alternate timeline from the main MCU films. The first season sees the Loki time variant traveling through time and altering human history, with a "man-on-the-run" and an "unexpected" science fiction quality to it; the season also explores Loki's identity. Loki falls in love with his female variant, Sylvie, in the season, which was a large part of Waldron's pitch for the series. He noted they were uncertain if portraying Loki falling in love with another version of himself was "too crazy". He continued by saying Loki was "ultimately about self-love, self-reflection, and forgiving yourself" and it "felt right" for the series be the character's first "real love story".

Feige stated in November 2019 that the series would tie-into Doctor Strange in the Multiverse of Madness, but in May 2021 he would not reconfirm this or whether the series would tie in with any other MCU projects, though he did say the series would "lay the groundwork" for the future of the MCU. Waldron noted that, as with all MCU properties, the aim was for Loki to have "wide-reaching ramifications" across the franchise. In the first season finale, "man behind the curtain" of the TVA is revealed to be He Who Remains, a variant of the Ant-Man and the Wasp: Quantumania (2023) character Kang the Conqueror. Jonathan Majors portrays both roles, and Waldron felt it made "so much sense" to introduce Majors in the series, since Kang is "a time-traveling, multiversal adversary" and thought to be "the next big cross-movie villain". The first season finale also sets up the events of Doctor Strange in the Multiverse of Madness, and elements of Spider-Man: No Way Home (2021).

Casting 
With the November 2018 announcement of the series, Hiddleston was expected to reprise his role as Loki, with his involvement confirmed in February 2019 by Walt Disney Studios chairman Alan F. Horn. In September 2019, Sophia Di Martino was cast in the "highly contested" role of Sylvie, a female variant of Loki. Waldron wanted to cast an actress in the role that matched the energy that Hiddleston brought to Loki, and described Di Martino as an accomplished British actress with not much familiarity to U.S. audiences whose prior work had "blown [him] away". In January 2020, Owen Wilson joined the cast as a "prominent character", later revealed to be Mobius M. Mobius, with Gugu Mbatha-Raw cast the following month as the female lead Ravonna Renslayer, also said to be a "prominent character".

In March 2020, Richard E. Grant was cast as Classic Loki, reportedly for a single episode of the series. That September, Jonathan Majors was cast as Kang the Conqueror for the film Ant-Man and the Wasp: Quantumania, with executives at Marvel Studios, Quantumania director Peyton Reed, Waldron, and Herron all involved in the casting since Majors was set to first appear in Loki as a variant of Kang called He Who Remains. When casting for the role, Waldron hoped to find someone "charismatic and magnetic" who would draw audiences in with the part, as he does with Loki and Sylvie in the series. Marvel Studios were eager to work with and cast Majors after seeing his performance in The Last Black Man in San Francisco (2019). Though this variant is not Kang, Herron noted that the series "sets the table for [his] future outings" and called it "a massive responsibility and privilege" to introduce the character. Sasha Lane was also revealed to have been cast as Hunter C-20 by the end of the month. In December, Wunmi Mosaku's casting was revealed, with Mosaku playing Hunter B-15.

In April 2021, Eugene Cordero was revealed to be appearing in the series as Casey, and later Hunter K-5E, while voice actress Tara Strong was revealed to be voicing Miss Minutes with the series' premiere. Strong, who had to audition for the role, originally created three versions of the character to present to the creative team: one where she did the character with an accent, one that was "a little bit more A.I." and "Siri-like", and one that had some more emotion. Jack Veal and DeObia Oparei also star as the Loki variants Kid Loki and Boastful Loki, respectively.

Hiddleston, Mbatha-Raw, Mosaku, Cordero, Strong, Wilson, and Di Martino will return as Loki, Renslayer, Hunter B-15, Casey / Hunter K-5E, Miss Minutes, Mobius, and Sylvie, respectively, for the second season. Cordero was made a series regular for the second season. Majors also returns in the season, portraying Victor Timely, another variant of He Who Remains and Kang the Conqueror who was introduced at the end of Quantumania.

Filming 
Filming for the first season occurred at Pinewood Atlanta Studios, with Autumn Durald Arkapaw serving as cinematographer. Location shooting took place in the Atlanta metropolitan area. Production on the first season was halted due to the COVID-19 pandemic. Filming for the second season occurred at Pinewood Studios in the United Kingdom, with Isaac Bauman serving as cinematographer.

Visual effects 
Visual effects for the first season were provided by Cantina Creative, Crafty Apes, Digital Domain, FuseFX, Industrial Light & Magic, Luma Pictures, Method Studios, Rise, Rodeo FX, and Trixter.

Music 
Natalie Holt serves as composer of the series. The score for the first season was released digitally by Marvel Music and Hollywood Records in two volumes: music from the first three episodes was released on July 2, 2021, and music from the last three episodes was released on July 23. The first episode's end credits track "TVA" was released as a single on June 11.

Release 
Loki debuted on Disney+ on June 9, 2021, with the first season consisting of six episodes, concluding on July 14. It is part of Phase Four of the MCU. The second season will also consist of six episodes, and will premiere in mid-2023 as part of Phase Five of the MCU.

Reception

Audience viewership 
In May 2022, Feige announced that Loki was the most-watched Marvel Studios Disney+ series to date.

Critical response 
For the first season, the review aggregator website Rotten Tomatoes reports a 92% approval rating with an average rating of 7.9/10, based on 331 reviews. The critical consensus reads, "A delightful diversion from the MCU as we know it, Loki successfully sees star Tom Hiddleston leap from beloved villain to endearing antihero—with a little help from Owen Wilson—in a series that's as off-kilter, charming, and vaguely dangerous as the demigod himself." Metacritic, which uses a weighted average, assigned a score of 74 out of 100 based on 32 critics, indicating "generally favorable reviews".

Accolades 
Loki was nominated for six Primetime Creative Arts Emmy Awards, five Critics' Choice Super Awards (winning one), one Harvey Award, one Hugo Award, three MTV Movie & TV Awards (winning two), four People's Choice Awards (winning two), one Screen Actors Guild Award, four Visual Effects Society Awards (winning one), and two Writers Guild of America Awards, among others.

Documentary special 

In February 2021, the documentary series Marvel Studios: Assembled was announced. The special on this series, Assembled: The Making of Loki, goes behind the scenes of the first season, featuring Waldron, Herron, Hiddleston, Mbatha-Raw, Mosaku, Wilson, Di Martino, Oparei, Grant, and Majors. The special was released on Disney+ on July 21, 2021.

References

External links 

 
 
 

 
2020s American drama television series
2020s American science fiction television series
2020s American time travel television series
2021 American television series debuts
Alternate history television series
American action adventure television series
American fantasy television series
Bureaucracy in fiction
Crime thriller television series
Disney+ original programming
English-language television shows
LGBT-related superhero television shows
Marvel Cinematic Universe: Phase Four television series
Marvel Cinematic Universe: Phase Five television series
Serial drama television series
Television about magic
Television productions suspended due to the COVID-19 pandemic
Television series about multiple time paths
Television series about parallel universes
Television series based on Norse mythology
Television series by Marvel Studios
Television shows based on works by Jack Kirby
Television shows based on works by Stan Lee
Television shows filmed at Pinewood Atlanta Studios
Television shows filmed at Pinewood Studios
Television shows filmed in Atlanta
Television shows filmed in Georgia (U.S. state)
Television shows scored by Natalie Holt
Temporal war fiction